Touraj Houshmandzadeh Jr. (born September 26, 1977) is an American former professional football player who was a wide receiver in the National Football League (NFL). He was selected by the Cincinnati Bengals in the seventh round of the 2001 NFL Draft. He previously played college football at Oregon State. Houshmandzadeh played for the Seattle Seahawks in 2009, the Baltimore Ravens in 2010 and the Oakland Raiders in 2011. In 2016, he joined Long Beach Poly High School as a wide receivers coach and was elevated to Varsity Offensive Coordinator in 2018. Houshmandzadeh also works as a football analyst for FS1.

College career

Cerritos College
Houshmandzadeh  dropped out of Barstow High School in Barstow, California. He later enrolled at Cerritos College. In his two seasons with the Cerritos College Falcons in 1998 and 1999, he was a two-time First-Team Mission Conference selection at wide receiver and kickoff returner. He wanted to play as running back his freshman year, but believing he was too tall to play running back, he voluntarily moved to the wide receiver position. He finished his Cerritos College Falcons career with 1,152 receiving yards on 65 receptions. He also had two 103-yard kickoff returns and a 92-yard punt return.

Oregon State University
Based on his junior college performance, Houshmandzadeh was offered an athletic scholarship at Oregon State University by then head coach Dennis Erickson.

In his sole season as a starter for Oregon State in the 2000 season, Houshmandzadeh caught 42 passes for 656 yards and six touchdowns.  He helped his team defeat Notre Dame in the 2001 Fiesta Bowl. Houshmandzadeh contributed a receiving touchdown, assisting his team to a 41–9 victory.

At Oregon State, he played with Chad Johnson, who would later be his teammate in the NFL with the Cincinnati Bengals.

Professional career

Cincinnati Bengals
Houshmandzadeh was drafted by the Cincinnati Bengals in the seventh round with the 204th overall pick in the 2001 NFL Draft.

Houshmandzadeh had a modest rookie season, recording 21 receptions for 228 yards, while also being used to return punts and kickoffs. His most notable achievement was in a game against the Cleveland Browns, in which he set a franchise record with 126 punt return yards.

After the 2001 season, questions about Houshmandzadeh's speed led to him slimming down to his prime playing weight of about 200 pounds, which increased his on-field performance remarkably. Houshmandzadeh has gained a number of rushing yards on reverse plays. In 2004, he rushed six times and gained 51 yards (8.5 yards per attempt); in 2005, he rushed eight times for 62 yards (7.8 yards per attempt) and scored his first career touchdown.

Houshmandzadeh was called one of the NFL's most overrated players by many pundits. In fact, ESPN.com analyst K.C. Joyner noted that with 39 dropped passes in the 2005 season, Houshmandzadeh ranked as the worst in the NFL.

"They're both unique", says former Bengals quarterback Carson Palmer of Johnson and Houshmandzadeh. "They do completely different things well and complement each other perfectly. T. J.'s a physical guy; a physical blocker, physical when he gets the ball. He's like (the Pittsburgh Steelers') Hines Ward."

Houshmandzadeh missed almost all of the 2003 season with a severe hamstring injury. In 2004, he was listed as the team's third receiver behind Peter Warrick and Chad Johnson. However, Warrick became injured and Houshmandzadeh was promoted to the starting lineup with Johnson.

Houshmandzadeh took advantage of his opportunity to prove himself, recording 73 receptions for 978 yards and four touchdowns. With the release of Warrick during the 2005 training camp, Houshmandzadeh retained the starting position and he and Johnson soon earned recognition for being among the NFL's most exciting receiving tandems. In March 2005, the Bengals rewarded Houshmandzadeh with a four-year, $13 million contract and an undisclosed bonus.

Early in the 2005 season, Houshmandzadeh suffered an injury to his right hand, which limited his effectiveness for several games. In the 2006 season, he battled a recurring minor foot injury that kept him out of the first two games of the regular season. On September 24, 2006, he made his season debut, catching nine passes for 94 yards and two fourth-quarter touchdowns in the Bengals' 28-20 win over their division foe Pittsburgh Steelers. The second of these catches was a tough reception in the end-zone against Steelers cornerback Deshea Townsend. Even though he was closely guarded by Townsend, Houshmandzadeh was able to tip Carson Palmer's pass, catch it, and gain possession as he landed on his back. For his performance, he was named the AFC offensive player of the week. 

In mid-2006, he suffered a mild concussion during the Bengals 49-41 loss to San Diego from an early hit by San Diego Chargers free safety Marlon McCree. He started as wide-out in both of Cincinnati's following victories against the New Orleans Saints and the Cleveland Browns.

Houshmandzadeh finished the 2006 season with 90 receptions for 1,081 yards and nine touchdowns, all career highs. His 90 receptions and nine touchdown catches led his team. He and Chad Johnson also became the first Bengals teammates ever to each record over 1,000 receiving yards in the same season.

Houshmandzadeh opened the 2007 season by scoring a touchdown against the Baltimore Ravens and two touchdowns in the loss to the Cleveland Browns. Against the Seattle Seahawks, Houshmandzadeh totaled 141 yards on 12 receptions for one touchdown. By the end of the year, he finished with a franchise record 112 receptions for 1,143 yards and 12 touchdowns. His 112 catches tied him with Wes Welker of the New England Patriots for the most in the NFL. He was also selected to the Pro Bowl for the first time in his career.

In 2008, Houshmandzadeh had 92 catches for 904 yards and four touchdowns. He did this while Carson Palmer was out with injury for most of the year.

Seattle Seahawks
Houshmandzadeh was signed by the Seattle Seahawks on March 2, 2009 to a five-year $40 million contract with $15 million guaranteed. He had also been courted by the Minnesota Vikings. The Cincinnati Bengals reportedly gave him an offer, but he countered the statement saying "Cincinnati's offer wasn't enough for me to continue to play there, I think I should be able to start fresh." He jokingly went on to say "I want to win some games for once", which is a reference to the Bengals' history of losing. The Bengals swept the AFC North on their way to a 10-6 record, while Seattle finished 5-11. Houshmandzadeh, however, had a decent year statistically, with 79 catches for 911 yards for an 11.5 yard receiving average, but only scored three touchdowns. On September 4, 2010, the Seahawks released Houshmandzadeh.

Baltimore Ravens
Houshmandzadeh signed a one-year deal with the Baltimore Ravens on September 6, 2010 for the veteran league minimum of $855,000. However, since his $7 million salary with the Seahawks was guaranteed in his previous contract, Seattle paid him the remaining $6.15 million for 2010. During his short and disappointing tenure in Baltimore, Houshmandzadeh recorded only 30 receptions for 398 yards. He managed to score only three touchdowns, although one of them won the Week 4 divisional matchup against the Pittsburgh Steelers. In the 2010 Divisional Playoff loss against Pittsburgh, Houshmandzadeh dropped a critical pass which would've converted a fourth down and potentially changed the outcome of the game. That, combined with his frequent complaining and general poor play, led to him not being re-signed. "If I go to the right team I'll shock a lot of people", he said while he was a free agent.

Oakland Raiders
The Oakland Raiders signed Houshmandzadeh on November 1, 2011. The signing reunited Houshmandzadeh with former Bengals quarterback Carson Palmer, as well as head coach Hue Jackson, who was a former assistant with the Bengals.

On December 4, 2011, against the Miami Dolphins, he caught his first touchdown as a member of the Oakland Raiders, a 40-yard pass from quarterback Carson Palmer, which was his only catch in the 34-14 rout by Miami. He finished 2011 with 11 catches for 146 yards for a 13.3 yard receiving average and one touchdown.

Records
 Team record most punt return yards in a game (126) vs. Cleveland, November 25, 2001  
 Tied NFL lead most receptions in a season (112) in 2007.

Andy Furman incident
Andy Furman, a sports commentator on Cincinnati's 700 WLW was fired on November 1, 2006 for referring to Houshmandzadeh as a racist on the air. On October 5, 2006, Houshmandzadeh had failed to appear for a paid appearance on the show the previous evening. The next evening, Furman, a New York City native, alleged that he heard from another source that Houshmandzadeh called him a "punk-ass white boy" for criticizing the no-show. Houshmandzadeh denied making the comment.

Background and surname
Houshmandzadeh was born to an Iranian American father and an African American mother.

His surname was often shortened to "Housh" or "Hoosh" by fans.

In Electronic Arts' Madden NFL series of games, Houshmandzadeh's surname was shortened to "Houshmandz". The game limited last names to 12 characters. The limit was increased to allow his and other players' names to be displayed in full beginning with Madden NFL 2010.

Houshmandzadeh's appeared in a popular fantasy football television commercial from 2006 where a fantasy player struggled to pronounce his surname, stumbling with words like "Houshamazilla", "Houshmazode", "Houshvadilla" and "Houshyomama". That season, former teammate Chad Ochocinco introduced him as "T. J. Who's-your-momma" on television during an ESPN Monday Night preseason game on August 28. Houshmandzadeh would have a career season that year. ESPN later referenced Houshmandzadeh's 2006 season in 2011 in a similar fantasy football commercial with the "Karaoke Draft of '06", with a fantasy football fan singing Houshmandzadeh's name to the tune of the 1977 hit song Barracuda by Heart.

References

External links
 Pro Football Reference Bio
 Seattle Seahawks bio
 Oakland Raiders Bio
 Yahoo! Sports – NFL – T.J. Houshmandzadeh
 

1977 births
Living people
People from Barstow, California
Players of American football from California
African-American players of American football
American Conference Pro Bowl players
American football wide receivers
American people of Iranian descent
Cerritos Falcons football players
Oregon State Beavers football players
Cincinnati Bengals players
Seattle Seahawks players
Sportspeople from San Bernardino County, California
Baltimore Ravens players
Oakland Raiders players
Sportspeople of Iranian descent
21st-century African-American sportspeople
20th-century African-American sportspeople